Ian Robert Smail is a British astrophysicist. He is Professor of Physics at the Durham University Department of Physics, based in the Centre for Extragalactic Astronomy, itself part of the Ogden Centre for Fundamental Physics. Since 2015, he has been ranked as one of the most highly-cited researchers in Space Sciences.

Education
Smail attended Emmanuel College, Cambridge on a Hooper Scholarship, where he completed the Natural Sciences tripos, graduating with an M.A. in Physics and Theoretical Physics in 1989. He carried out his doctoral studies in Astronomy (1989–1993) at Durham University (University College), for a thesis entitled Gravitational Lensing by Rich Clusters, supervised by Richard Ellis.

Career
From 1993 to 1995 Smail was a NATO Advanced Research Fellow in the Physics, Maths and Astronomy Division at Caltech, and subsequently a Carnegie Fellow at the Observatories of the Carnegie Institution for Science. He returned to Durham in 1996 to become a PPARC Advanced Research Fellow (1996–1998) and then from 1998 a Royal Society University Research Fellow in the Department of Physics. He was made a Professor in 2004.

Honours
In 2001 Smail, alongside fellow Durham researcher Ben Moore, was one of the first recipients of the Philip Leverhulme Prize in the Astronomy and Astrophysics category. He received a Royal Society Wolfson Research Merit Award in 2013.

References

Academics of Durham University
Alumni of Emmanuel College, Cambridge
Alumni of University College, Durham
British astrophysicists
California Institute of Technology faculty
Living people
Year of birth missing (living people)